John Winter is an Australian film and television writer, director and producer. He is best known for producing Rabbit-Proof Fence, Doing Time for Patsy Cline and Paperback Hero. His directorial debut Black & White & Sex premiered at the 2011 Sydney Film Festival with its international premiere at the 41st International Film Festival Rotterdam. The film won the 'Best Experimental' at the 2012 ATOM Awards.

Career 
Winter began his career at the ABC Television, where he was a production manager. His credits during this time include the Nature of Australia series, A Dangerous Life, Bodysurfer, Police Rescue, and Come in Spinner. During this period he co-wrote and directed the short film Paper Dart, that screened at the St Kilda Film Festival.

In 1995 he produced Vacant Possession which received 4 Australian Film Institute (AFI) nominations and won a Special Jury prize at Créteil.

In 1997 John also produced Doing Time for Patsy Cline which opened Sydney Film Festival and received 10 AFI nominations including Best Film. The film was a critical and box office success.

Winter was script producer on the first series of the ABC's high rating television drama series, Sea Change, before returning to producing with Paperback Hero starring Hugh Jackman and Claudia Karvan. My Mother Frank followed, premiering at Berlin International Film Festival. It starred Matthew Newton, Sinéad Cusack, and Sam Neill,  closed the Sydney Film Festival and won Most Popular Feature Film at the Melbourne International Film Festival.

Winter also produced Phillip Noyce's acclaimed Rabbit-Proof Fence that won Best Film at the 2002 AFI Awards.

Directing 
Winter has directed several short films, including Apartment 1911, which premiered at the 2016 Byron Bay Film Festival.

Mirror Mirror, starring Roy Billing, screened at 27 international film festivals, including Frameline and the London Lesbian & Gay Film Festival. It was the opening short of the 2008 Melbourne Queer Film Festival.

Winter's feature film directorial debut is Black & White & Sex (2011).The film had its world premiere at the Sydney Film Festival on 18 June 2011.

Awards 
 Winner 2002 AFI Award - Best Film Rabbit-Proof Fence
 Nominated 1997 AFI Award - Best Film Doing Time for Patsy Cline
 Winner 2012 ATOM Awards - 'Best Experimental' Black & White & Sex
 Nominated 2012 Taipei Film Festival - International New Talent Competition - Grand Prize Black & White & Sex

Selected filmography

References

External links

Living people
1956 births